The Tanggula (Chinese: , p Tánggǔlāshān, or , p Tánggǔlāshānmài), Tangla, Tanglha, or Dangla Mountains (Tibetan: , w Gdang La, z Dang La) are a mountain range in the central part of the Qinghai-Tibet Plateau in Tibet. Administratively, the range is in the Nagqu Prefecture of the Tibet Autonomous Region, with the central section extending into  nearby Tanggula Town and the eastern section entering the Yushu Tibetan Autonomous Prefecture of Qinghai province.

The Tanggula is the source of the Ulan Moron and Dangqu Rivers, the geographic headwaters of the Yangtze River. The range thus functions as a dividing range between the basin of the Yangtze in the north and the endorheic basins of north-eastern Tibet in the south.

Overview

The Qinghai-Tibet Highway and the Qinghai-Tibet Railway cross the Tanggula Mountains at  Tanggula Mountain Pass. On account of snow and occasional road accidents, highway closures and concomitant traffic delays are not uncommon.

The mountains lie within the Tibetan Plateau alpine shrub and meadows ecoregion.

See also

Geladandong
Nyenchen Tanglha Mountains
Tanggula Pass
Tanggula railway station
Tanggula North railway station
Tanggula South railway station
Tibetan Plateau

References

Mountain ranges of Tibet